is a Family Computer Mini 4WD-based video game developed and published by Konami, which was released exclusively in Japan in 1989.

References

1989 video games
Japan-exclusive video games
Konami games
Nintendo Entertainment System games
Nintendo Entertainment System-only games
Racing video games
Tamiya Corporation
Digital tabletop games
Video games based on toys
Multiplayer and single-player video games
Video games developed in Japan